Robert Dix (born 2 February 1953) is an Irish sailor. He competed in the 470 event at the 1976 Summer Olympics.

References

External links
 

1953 births
Living people
Irish male sailors (sport)
Olympic sailors of Ireland
Sailors at the 1976 Summer Olympics – 470
Place of birth missing (living people)